A sponsorship broker is an individual, or agency, that procures sponsorship funding for properties (defined as an outlet with a captive audience that provides for a positive experience). Sponsorship brokers tend to specialize to particular niches within the sponsorship-marketing field.

A typical sponsorship could be, for example, an arrangement  to exchange advertising for the responsibility of providing funding for a popular event or entity.  For example, a corporate entity may provide equipment for a famous band in exchange for brand recognition.  The sponsor earns popularity this way while the sponsored can earn a lot of money and/or receive free music equipment.  This type of sponsorship is prominent in the sports, arts, media and charity sectors.

See also 
Donation
Cause marketing
Ambush marketing
Sports marketing
Sustaining program
European Sponsorship Association

References 

Sponsorships